José Mauricio Manzano López (born 30 September 1943 in San Salvador) is a retired football player from El Salvador who represented his country at the 1970 FIFA World Cup in Mexico.

International career
Manzano has represented his country in youth team selections and the senior team in 5 FIFA World Cup qualification matches as well as in one game at the 1970 FIFA World Cup Finals. He was injured in the first half of that latter match against Belgium, missing the other group games as a consequence.

Retirement
After retiring as a player, Manzano left the capital for the countryside to work as an agricultural engineer for the Ministry of Agriculture. On his return to San Salvador, he picked up football again as a coach.

Honours
Salvadoran Cup: 1
 1970

References

External links

1943 births
Living people
Sportspeople from San Salvador
Association football defenders
Salvadoran footballers
El Salvador international footballers
1970 FIFA World Cup players
C.D. Atlético Marte footballers
C.D. FAS footballers
Salvadoran football managers